The Centerville Community School District is a public school district headquartered in Centerville, Iowa.

It serves areas in Appanoose County, including Centerville, Cincinnati, Exline, Mystic, Numa, Rathbun and the surrounding rural areas.

The school's athletic teams are the Reds and Redettes, their colors are Scarlet and Black, and they are in the South Central Conference.

Tom Rubel was hired as the interim superintendent in 2016.

Schools
The district operates five schools, all in Centerville:
 Centerville Community Preschool
 Central Ward Elementary School
 Lakeview Elementary School
 Howar Middle School
 Centerville High School

References

External links
 Centerville Community School District

See also
List of school districts in Iowa

School districts in Iowa
Education in Appanoose County, Iowa